Pątnów Power Station is a lignite fired power plant in Pątnów, northern suburbs of Konin, Poland with a total generation capacity of 1674 MW.  The first unit of Pątnów Power Station went in service in 1967. The newest unit of Pątnów Power Station is Pątnów II with a generation capacity of 474 MW. It  has a 135 metres high boiler house, which is the highest boiler house in Poland. Pątnów Power Station has 5 chimneys, each 150 metres tall. A 200 metres tall chimney of Pątnów Power Station was demolished in 2008.

In 2022 Korea Hydro & Nuclear Power agreed to build several nuclear reactors at the Pątnów power plant.

See also

 List of power stations in Poland

References

External links
 Pątnów II

Coal-fired power stations in Poland